Nick O'Callaghan (born March 11, 1997) is an American professional soccer player who plays as a defender for South Georgia Tormenta in USL League One.

Career

Youth and college 
O'Callaghan started his prep career at Winter Springs High School and was a member of the Orlando City SC academy, helping the team make the playoffs in 2014. He began his college soccer career at Elon University in 2015, appearing as a three-year starter for Elon Phoenix between 2015 and 2017, making 49 appearances, scoring 2 goals and tallying 5 assists. In his senior year, O'Callaghan transferred to Florida International University, spending 2018 as a redshirted player.

While at college, O'Callaghan appeared for USL PDL side Orlando City U-23 in 2015 and SIMA Águilas during their 2018 season.

Orlando City B 
On January 13, 2020, O'Callaghan was selected in the third round (57th overall) in the 2020 MLS SuperDraft by Orlando City. In March 2020, he signed a professional contract with Orlando City B, the team's USL League One affiliate. On August 1, 2020, he made his debut in the season opener, starting in a 2–0 defeat to South Georgia Tormenta. He was released at the end of the season.

South Georgia Tormenta 
On February 23, 2021, O'Callaghan joined USL League One side South Georgia Tormenta.

References

External links 
 Nick O’Callaghan Elon bio
 Nick O’Callaghan FIU bio
 Nick O’Callaghan at Orlando City SC
 

1997 births
American soccer players
Association football defenders
Elon Phoenix men's soccer players
FIU Panthers men's soccer players
Living people
Orlando City B players
Orlando City SC draft picks
Orlando City U-23 players
People from Winter Springs, Florida
SIMA Águilas players
Soccer players from Florida
Sportspeople from Seminole County, Florida
Tormenta FC players
USL League One players
USL League Two players